Dorothy Okello is an Ugandan technologist, professor, and engineer known for founding the Women of Uganda Network or WOUGNET. In 2016, she became the first female president of the Uganda Institute of Professional Engineers Association.

Education
She has a BSc in Electrical Engineering from Makerere University, Uganda, a MSc in Electrical Engineering from the University of Kansas where she was a Fulbright Scholar, and a PhD in Electrical Engineering from McGill University in Montreal, Canada (where she received a Commonwealth Scholarship). She has worked to get more women and rural communities engaged in the information society.

Career
Okello is Africa's first-ever Digital Woman of the Year, an honour bestowed upon her at an Africa ICT Days gala ceremony for the Digital Woman Award finalists that took place on 16 November in Yaoundé, Cameroon.

In October 2012, Okello was awarded the Women Achievers Award for her service in empowering women and girls through Science and Technology.

Okello was elected as the first female president of the Uganda Institution of Professional Engineers at the institution AGM on 29 April 2016. On 2 June 2016 a congratulatory letter from the Irish President Michael D. Higgins was presented to her by the Irish Ambassador to Uganda Dónal Cronin on becoming the first female president of the institution.

Okello is married with three children.

References

Ugandan women engineers
Year of birth missing (living people)
Living people
Ugandan electrical engineers
Makerere University alumni
21st-century women engineers